Miguel Gregorio de la Luz Atenógenes Miramón y Tarelo, known as Miguel Miramón, (29 September 1831 – 19 June 1867) was a Mexican conservative general who became president of Mexico at the age of twenty seven during the Reform War, serving between February 1859 and December 1860. He was the first Mexican president to be born after the Mexican War of Independence.

A cadet in military school at the beginning of the Mexican–American War, Miramón saw action at the Battle of Molino del Rey and the Battle of Chapultepec during the American invasion of Mexico City. After the triumph of the liberal Plan of Ayutla in 1855, Miramón participated in a series of conservative counter coups until his efforts merged with the wider Reform War led by conservative president Félix María Zuloaga. The first year of the war was marked by a series of conservative victories achieved by Miramón, leading the press to dub him "Young Maccabee". After a moderate faction of conservatives overthrew Zuloaga in an effort to reach a compromise with liberals, a conservative junta of representatives elected Miramón as president. Miramón would lead the conservatives for the rest of the war, leading two sieges against the liberal capital of Veracruz, where Benito Juárez maintained his role as president of the Second Federal Republic. The second siege failed after the United States Navy intercepted Miramón's naval forces, and liberal victories accumulated hereafter, ending the war in 1860. Miramón escaped the country and went into exile in Europe, being received at the Spanish court.

He returned to Mexico in 1862 during the early stages of the Second French intervention, offering his assistance to the Second Mexican Empire. Emperor Maximilian was a liberal and in order to diffuse conservative opposition to the Empire, he sent Miramón to Prussia, ostensibly to study military tactics. As the Empire began to falter, Miramón returned to Mexico, and joined Maximilian until the fall of the Second Mexican Empire in May 1867. The restored Mexican government had Miramón, Maximilian and Tomas Mejía court martialed and sentenced to death. They were shot on June 19, 1867.

Early life
Miramón was born in Mexico City on September 29, 1831, into a very traditional family of partial French heritage. His grandfather was from the province of Béarn. He was the son of Colonel Bernardo de Miramón and his wife Carmen Tarelo. He was one of twelve children and enrolled in the military college on February 10, 1846. The Mexican–American War broke out a few months later. As the Americans entered Mexico City, Miramón himself would join the fighting and during the first weeks of September in 1847, he saw action at the Battle of Molino del Rey and the Battle of Chapultepec, being wounded and being taken prisoner during the latter. He was released in June, 1848 after the war had ended.

In military school he went through the regular grades of promotion, from corporal to lieutenant of artillery. In 1852 he served in Jalisco, and in 1853 was in some actions under generals Mariano Salas and Rosas Landa in the department of Mexico. After that he saw much active service, and rose rapidly through the ranks, being made a brevet lieutenant colonel on the 6th of July, 1855, and on the 30th of the same month a fully commissioned lieutenant colonel.

La Reforma
During the period of La Reforma, Miramón participated in the various conservative counter revolutions after the triumph of the liberal Plan of Ayutla in 1855. He joined Antonio de Haro y Tamariz at Zacapoaxtla in 1856, fighting at the head of the 10th and 11th battalions at the Loma de Montero. He saw action at the goteras de Puebla on March 10, but went into hiding when the city fell.

In October, 1856, he was second in command of a conservative revolt proclaimed at Puebla. With a thousand soldiers, he defended the city for forty three days against an army of six thousand man, causing great damage to the liberal forces. When the city finally fell Miramón refused to surrender and instead at the head of one hundred and fifty men fled and took the city of Toluca on January 18, 1857, seizing some artillery and then heading to the town of Temascaltepec where he was wounded and defeated. He was imprisoned, but escaped in September, soon after joining the reactionary forces in the South. As second in command, he captured the city of Cuernavaca and in January 1858 to Mexico City where the Plan of Tacubaya led by Félix Zuloaga had overthrown the liberal government of Ignacio Comonfort, also inaugurating what came to be known as the Reform War.

Reform War

Early Role
Miramón would play a key role in the initial offensive, and the series of conservative victories that occurred during 1858. On March 10, 1858, Miramón was a commander at the Battle of Salamanca, which opened up the interior of the country to the conservatives.

On July 24, Miramón and Tomas Mejía captured Guanajuato, and they captured San Luis Potosí September 12. The liberal commander of the north, Santiago Vidaurri was then defeated by them at the Battle of Ahualulco on September 29. By October the conservatives were at the height of their strength.

On December 20, 1858, about a year since he first came to power, Zuloaga had to face a pronunciamiento against himself led by a moderate faction of the conservatives who wished to compromise with the liberal government. Miguel María de Echegaray pronounced at Ayotla with a plan to summon a congress to frame a constitution suitable for the nation. Zuloaga passed measures to put down the revolt, assuming personal command of the forces at the capital, and forbidding all interaction with the rebels. He passed a manifesto condemning Echeagaray who was stripped of his post in the army. Manuel Doblado was also arrested.

A modified form of the Ayotla Plan was proclaimed by Manuel Robles Pezuela on December 23, and found some military support in the capital. Zuloaga offered to resign if the objection was to him personally, but would not assent if the plan was meant to overthrow his conservative principles. Miramón was offered command of the plan, but he rejected it.

The Plan of Ayotla was actually an offshoot of the aforementioned fusionist party, a moderate faction, which did not seek to abandon conservative principles, but did seek an end to the war by seeking compromise with the liberals. Manuel Robles Pezuela arrived at the national palace on the morning of December 24, when he assumed the presidency.

Robles Pezuela sent commissioners out to gain adherence to his plan, and began to assemble a junta of representatives ignoring, however the conservative hero Miguel Miramón, upsetting conservative hardliners. Robles, however eventually conceded in granting Miramón representation.

The Junta assembled on December 30, 1858, and proceeded to elect a president. Miramón won with 50 votes against Robles’ 46, though the latter was authorized to act as provisional president until Miramón arrived in the capital.

Meanwhile, Zuloaga still claiming the presidency, agreed to officially pass on the presidency to Miramón on January 31, 1859. To keep him from changing his mind, Miramón had him sent to the interior.

Presidency
Miramón's most important military priority was now the capture of Veracruz. He left the capital on February 16, leading his troops in person along with his minister of war. Meanwhile, Aguascalientes and Guanajuato had fallen to the liberals. Liberal troops in the West were led by Degollado and headquartered in Morelia, which now served as a liberal arsenal. The conservatives meanwhile, feeling the effects of the malarial climate, abandoned the siege of Veracruz by March 29. Degollado made another attempt on Mexico City in early April and was utterly routed in Tacubaya by Leonardo Márquez, who captured a large amount of war material, and who also in this battle gained infamy for including medics among those executed in the aftermath of the battle.

On April 6, the Juárez government was recognized by the United States, and on July 12, the liberal government nationalized the property of the church, and suppressed the monasteries, the sale of which provided the liberal war effort with new funds, though not as much as had been hoped for since speculators were waiting for more stable times to make purchases.

Miramón met the liberal forces in November at which a truce was declared and a conference was held on the matter of the Constitution of 1857 and the possibility of a constituent congress. Negotiations broke down, however and hostilities resumed on the 12th after which Degollado was routed at the Battle of Las Vacas.

On December 14, 1859, the Juárez government signed the Mclane Ocampo Treaty, which granted the U.S. perpetual rights to transport goods across three key trade routes in Mexico, including troops, and granted Americans an element of extraterritoriality. The treaty caused consternation among the conservatives, the European press, and members of Juárez' cabinet, however the issue was rendered moot when the U.S. Senate failed to approve the treaty.

Meanwhile, Miramón was preparing another siege of Veracruz, heading out of the capital on February 8, once again leading his troops in person along with his war minister, hoping to rendevouz with a small naval squadron led by the Mexican General Marin, and disembarking from Havana. The United States Navy however had orders to intercept it.

Miramón arrived at Medellin on the 2nd of March, and awaited for Marin's attack in order to begin the siege. The American steamer Indianola however had anchored itself near the fortress of San Juan de Ulua, in order to defend Veracruz from attack.

On March 6, Marin's squadron, composed of the General Miramón, and the Marques de la Habana, arrived in Veracruz, and captured by Captain Jarvis of the U.S. Navy. The ships were sent to New Orleans, along with the now imprisoned General Marin, depriving the conservatives of an attacking force and the substantial amount of artillery, guns, and rations that they were carrying on board for delivery to Miramón.

Miramón's effort to siege Veracruz was abandoned on the 20th of March, and he arrived back in the capital on April 7. The conservatives had also been suffering defeats in the interior losing Aguascalients and San Luis Potosi before the end of April. Degollado was sent into the interior to lead the liberal campaign as their enemies now ran out of resources. He appointed Uraga as Quartermaster General

Uraga split his troops and attempted to lure Miramón out strategically to isolate him, however On late May however, Uraga then committed the strategic blunder of attempting to assault Guadalajara with Miramón's troops behind him. The assault failed and Uraga was taken prisoner.

Miramón was routed however, on August 10, in Sialo, which resulted in his commander Tomas Mejía being taken prisoner, and Miramón retreated to Mexico City. In response to the disaster, Miramón resigned as president, but the conservative junta only elected him president again after a two days interregnum.

By the end of August, liberals were preparing for a decisive final battle. The capital was cut off from the rest of the country. Guadalajara was surrounded by 17,000 liberal troops while the conservatives in the city only had 7000. The conservative commander Castillo surrendered without firing a shot, and was allowed to leave the city with his troops. Meanwhile, Leonardo Márquez was routed on the 10th of November, attempting to reinforce Castillo without being aware of his surrender.

Miramón on November 3 convoked a war council including prominent citizens to meet the crisis and by November 5 it was resolved to fight until the end. The conservatives were now struggling with a shortage of funds, and increasing defections. Nonetheless, Miramón gained a victory when he attacked the liberal headquarters of Toluca on the 9th of December, in which almost all of their forces were captured.

General Gonzalez Ortega however approached the capital with reinforcements. The decisive battle took place on December 22, at San Miguel Calpulalpan. The conservatives had 8000 troops and the liberals 16,000. Miramón lost and retreated back towards the capital.

Another war council now agreed to surrender. The conservative government fled the city, and Miramón intending to head towards the coast and Márquez escaped into the mountains of Michoacan. The triumphant liberals entered the city with 25,000 troops on the 1st of January, 1861, and Juárez entered the capital at January 11.

Second Mexican Empire
On his way to the coast Miramón was intercepted at the town of Jico, near Jalapa, but he was saved by chance while two of his companions, Diaz y Ordonez fell into the hands of the liberals. Miramón hid in Jalapa and later left to Europe on board the French steamer Le Mercure. In response to Miramón's financial raids on British citizens during the war, the British government complained to the French government. Juárez also sought Miramón's arrest. On December 2, 1861, Miramón was received and honored at the Spanish court.

He did not remain long in Europe, and returned during the Tripartite Expedition of French, Spanish, and English forces. He was hardly received warmly by the expeditionary forces, who at this point were simply on a debt collection mission with no intention of upending the Juárez government, and the English representative Dunlop had Miramón arrested and exiled to Cuba, prohibiting Miramón from returning to Mexico.

The tripartite coalition however fell apart, once it became clear that France unilaterally intended to overthrow the Mexican government and organize a client state with the help of conservative collaborators like Juan Almonte. The French entered the capital on June 10, 1863. On June 16 the French government nominated 35 Mexican citizens to constitute a Junta Superior de Gobierno who were then tasked with electing a triumvirate that were to serve as the executive of the new government. The three elected were Juan Almonte, Archbishop Labastida, and Jose Mariano Salas. The Junta was also to choose 215 Mexican citizens who together with the Junta Superior were to constitute an Assembly of Notables that was to decide upon the form of government. On the 11th of July, the Assembly published its resolutions, that Mexico was to be a constitutional monarchy and that Ferdinand Maximilian of Habsburg was to be invited to accept the Mexican throne. The executive was then officially changed into the Regency of the Mexican Empire.

It was at this point that Miramón successfully reentered the country by way of the northern frontier, arriving in Mexico City on July 28, 1863, and offering his services to the regency. Maximilian accepted the throne of Mexico in April, 1864, and arrived in the nation about a month later. Ironically, given the conservatives’ role in bringing him to power, Maximilian was a liberal, who believed in accepting the progressive laws over which the Reform War had been fought over, and in order to neuter conservative opposition to this, he sent his conservative generals out of the country including Miramón who was sent to Berlin in order to study the organization of the Prussian Army.

Miramón only returned to Mexico on November 9, 1866, when the Empire was already faltering. There were rumors that Maximilian was going to abdicate and leave the nation, and Miramón considered putting himself at the head of the conservative armies as he had been during the Reform War, but when Miramón arrived, Maximilian was still in power, and deciding to remain loyal to the Empire, Miramón offered him his services. He advised Maximilian not to abdicate, and offered to fight for him, even at the cost of his life.

After a council at Orizaba which decided against his abdication, Maximilian intended to return to Mexico City, first remaining at Puebla for nearly three weeks, and making preparations for the campaign. The country was divided into three great military districts the western, comprising the provinces north of Colima, including Durango and Chihuahua; the eastern, stretching from Aguascalientes and Tampico northward; and the central, embracing all the vast remainder to Chiapas. Miramón, who took command of the western district, had already set out to create his army, with little regard for the means to be employed, but Mejía in the east stood at the head of nearly 4,000 men; and Márquez, controlling the centre, had 4,000 under Méndez in Michoacan, and fully 2,000 at Puebla, Maximilian assumed the supreme command, and issued orders for the active formation of the new national army as well as militia.

Unfortunately for the Empire, the Western and Eastern military district were in possession of the Republicans, as well as the region south of Puebla, while the few remaining central provinces were overrun by hostile bands and about to be invaded by the Republican armies. Funds and resources were also lacking. Meanwhile, arms and funds from the United States were pouring into the Republic armies.

On January 27, 1867, Miramón triumphantly captured Aguascalientes and nearly succeeded in capturing Juárez, the retreat of Governor Auza managing to save him. Miramón however, did not intend to advance any further, satisfied with the forced loan and the diversion he had created among the Republicans, he retired to join Castillo at San Luis Potosi. The Republican general Mariano Escobedo figured out his intentions and intercepted him at San Jacinto at February 1, leading to a complete rout. Miramón escaped with Castillo and took refuge in Querétaro. The Republicans had by then captured Guanajuato, and then Morelia. The Imperialists retreated from Michoacan to the borders of San Luis Potosi and fell back upon Querétaro.

Siege of Queretaro
Maximilian joined the army at Querétaro along with Minister Aguirre, Leonardo Márquez, and López with the sum of fifty thousand pesos, with sixteen hundred men and twelve cannons. Maximilian reached Querétaro on February 19, and was received by enthusiasm Miramón and the other generals meeting him at a formal reception.

A few days after their arrival a review of the troops was held, showing 9,000 men with 39 cannon, including about 600 Frenchmen, Miramón was placed at the head of the infantry, of which Castillo and Casanova received each a division, Méndez assuming command of the reserve brigade, in which López served as colonel, Mejía became chief of the cavalry, Reyes of engineers, and Arellano of the artillery. To, Márquez, chief of the general staff, was accorded the foremost place, greatly to the anger of Miramón. Maximilian, Miramón, Márquez, Mejía, and Méndez became known as "the five magic M's" of the Empire.

In the first council of war that had been held on February 22, it had been agreed to fight the Republicans at once, before their combined forces became too strong, but ultimately this strategy, which historian Bancroft suggests could have achieved victory, was rejected at the behest of Márquez. As the liberals began to surround Querétaro, Márquez then suggested to flee to Mexico City, still held by the Imperialists, gather their forces and face the liberal armies in one final decisive battle, but this was deemed as impractical.

On March 5, the Republican forces came into view of the defenders at Querétaro, and began to prepare for a siege. After the fighting had begun Márquez once again brought up his plan of retreating to Mexico, but Miramón and others strongly opposed him. Miramón planned to lead a counterattack to recover the hill of San Gregorio on March 17. When the time arrived however, a false alarm arose that the Imperialist headquarters were under attack, leading the counterattack to be put off.

Miramón now placed his support for a plan to destroy the Western besieging lines therefore providing a way to retreat if needed. Márquez was assigned to go to Mexico City to seek reinforcements. Miramón was assigned to provide a distraction and on March 22 he led an expedition down the valley, which captured a quantity of provisions. Márquez was able to depart during the night with 1200 horsemen and Miramón now became the leading general at Querétaro.

After the Imperialists repulsed another Republican assault, leaving the latter with 2000 deaths, Miramón, during an award ceremony, took one of the medals and asked to decorate the Emperor for his conduct during the battle, which Maximilian accepted, and wore as the most valued of his decorations.

On April 1 Miramón led a counterattack to the hill of San Gregorio, but lack of reinforcements left the attack without any decisive results.

As any news of Márquez failed to arrive, a mission was sent to Mexico City to see what happened. Miramón urged Maximilian to leave as well but, the latter chose to stay. The mission failed, and now leading officers outright urged surrender.

The Imperialists now planned to fight their way out of Querétaro, and as preparation Miramón planned an attack on the Cimatario Hill on April 27, to which he advanced with 2000 men. The Imperialist repulsed the Republican forces, dispersing thousands and taking 500 prisoners, but the Imperialists squandered vital time planning their next move, and Republican reserves arrived to provide a defeat.

The Imperialists now sought to break through the enemy lines and seek refuge in the ranges of Sierra Gorda, and possibly reach the coast. The movement was planned for May 15.

Unfortunately for the Imperialists, before these plans were carried out they were betrayed by Colonel Miguel López, and on the night of May 14, he opened the gates of Querétaro to the Republican forces in exchange for a sum of gold.

Surprised by enemy troops at night, Miramón fought back, and he was shot in the face, being carried by friendly forces to the house of a Querétaro physician, Dr. Licea, who then turned Miramón over to the Republicans.

Court Martial and Execution
Maximilian, Miramón, and Mejía were tried for violating an 1862 Decree passed in the early stages of the French Intervention, against traitors and invaders. After the trial, a unanimous verdict of guilty was brought forth on the night of June 14, and the sentence of death was passed.

Among those who pled President Juárez to spare their lives was Miramón's wife who weeping with her two children, fainted at the foot of the president. Maximilian wrote to his European relatives asking them to take care of Miramón's wife and her children.

The three condemned were led to the Cerro de las Campanas outside of Querétaro on the morning of June 19. Miramón and Mejía stood to the side of Maximilian, but the latter then remarked to Miramón that “a brave soldier is respected by his sovereign; permit me to yield to you the place of honor,” and Miramón was subsequently given the center position. Before being executed he read a brief piece disavowing the charge of traitor. All three were executed at around seven in the morning.

See also

List of heads of state of Mexico

References

Further reading
Araujo, Román. "El General Miguel Miramón, rectificaciones y adiciones a la obra del Sr. D. Víctor Daran, titulada Notas sobre la historia de México." (2000).
Cánovas, Agustín Cué. El tratado Mon-Almonte: Miramón, el Partido conservador y la intervención europea. No. 3. Ediciones Los Insurgentes, 1960.
Daran, Victor. Le général Miguel Miramón: notes sur l'histoire du Mexique. Rome, E. Perino, 1886.
Fuentes Mares, José. Miramón: El hombre. 1985.
Galeana, Patricia. "Los conservadores en el poder: Miramón." Estudios de Historia Moderna y Contemporánea de México 14.014 (1991).
González Montesinos, Carlos. "Por Querétaro hacia la eternidad. El general Miguel Miramón en el Segundo Imperio." México, Comunicación Gráfica (2000).
Hale, Charles A. "Causa de Fernando Maximiliano de Hapsburgo y sus Generales Miguel Miramón y Tomás Mejía." (1969): 606–607.
Islas García, Luis. Miramón: Caballero del infortunio. 2nd edition. 1957.
Miramón, Miguel, et al. Proceso de Fernando Maximiliano de Hapsburgo, Miguel Miramón y Tomás Mejía. No. 57. Editorial Jus, 1966.
Sánchez-Navarro, Carlos. Miramón: el caudillo conservador. Editorial" Jus", 1945.

External links

El Balero: Miguel Miramón
Guide to the Miramón family papers at The Bancroft Library

Presidents of Mexico
Mexican generals
1832 births
1867 deaths
Executed presidents
Executed Mexican people
People executed for treason against Mexico
People executed by Mexico by firing squad
Conservatism in Mexico
Mexican monarchists
Politicians from Mexico City
Second French intervention in Mexico
Mexican people of French descent
Mexican–American War
1850s in Mexico
1860s in Mexico
1859 in Mexico
1860 in Mexico
19th-century Mexican politicians
19th-century rulers in North America